Owen Emeric Vidal was the Anglican Bishop of Sierra Leone from 1852 until his death three years later.

Life
He was the son of Emeric Essex Vidal and his wife Anna Jane Capper, daughter of the Rev. James Capper, born at Easthampstead. He was educated at St Paul's School, Southsea. He matriculated at St John's College, Cambridge, in 1838, where he graduated B.A. in 1842, and M.A. in 1845; he was awarded a D.D. in 1852.

Ordained deacon in March 1843, Vidal was ordained priest in December of the same year. He was Vicar of Holy Trinity, Upper Dicker until his elevation to the episcopate.  He died while on a sea voyage back to his see and was buried at Freetown on 27 December 1855.

Family
Vidal married in 1852 Anne Adelaide Hoare, the fourth daughter of the Rev. Henry Hoare, vicar of Framfield.

References

External links
Bibliographic directory from Project Canterbury

1819 births
Alumni of St John's College, Cambridge
19th-century Anglican bishops in Sierra Leone
English Anglican missionaries
Anglican missionaries in Sierra Leone
Anglican bishops of Sierra Leone
1854 deaths